The 2002 Calgary Stampeders season was the 45th season for the team in the Canadian Football League and their 64th overall. The Stampeders finished in 5th place in the West Division with a 6–12 record and failed to make the playoffs, marking the first time Wally Buono had missed the playoffs in his 13 years as head coach of the team.

Offseason

CFL Draft

Preseason

Regular season

Season standings

Season schedule

Awards and records

2002 CFL All-Stars
OG – Jay McNeil

References

Calgary Stampeders seasons
Calgary Stampeders Season, 2002
2002 in Alberta